Sarcoglyphis is a genus of flowering plants from the orchid family, Orchidaceae. It is native to Southeast Asia, the Himalayas and southern China.

Species currently accepted as of June 2014:

Sarcoglyphis arunachalensis A.N.Rao - Arunachal Pradesh
Sarcoglyphis brevilabia Aver. - Vietnam
Sarcoglyphis comberi (J.J.Wood) J.J.Wood - Java
Sarcoglyphis fimbriata (Ridl.) Garay - Sarawak
Sarcoglyphis flava (Hook.f.) Garay - Myanmar
Sarcoglyphis lilacina (J.J.Sm.) Garay - Sumatra
Sarcoglyphis magnirostris Z.H.Tsi -Yunnan
Sarcoglyphis masiusii Miadin, A.L.Lamb & Emoi - Sabah
Sarcoglyphis mirabilis (Rchb.f.) Garay - Indochina
Sarcoglyphis pensilis (Ridl.) Seidenf. - Malaysia
Sarcoglyphis potamophila (Schltr.) Garay & W.Kittr. - Borneo
Sarcoglyphis smithiana (Kerr) Seidenf. - Yunnan, Laos, Thailand, Vietnam
Sarcoglyphis thailandica Seidenf. - Thailand

See also
 List of Orchidaceae genera

References

External links

Vandeae genera
Aeridinae
Orchids of Asia